Marian Czapla (July 28, 1946 – January 12, 2016) was a Polish painter and graphic artist.

Born on July 28, 1946, in Gacki near Szydłów, Czapla graduated from the School of Plastic Arts in Kielce. He then attended the Academy of Fine Arts in Warsaw and was a pupil of Stefan Gierowski (painting), Halina Chrostowska, and Joseph Pakulski (graphics).

Czapla co-founded the art group Simplex S4, of which he was a member from 1974 to 1979. Since 1972 he has been a professor of painting at his former university. His works have been displayed at many solo exhibitions and group exhibitions in Poland and abroad. The National Museum in Kielce held an exhibition from May 24 to July 28, 2002, which featured 155 pieces from three decades of Czapla's work.

He lived in Warsaw, and after 1979 was an Honorary Citizen of the municipality of Szydłów. He died on January 12, 2016, at the age of 69.

References

Sources

 Marian Czapla. W 30-lecie pracy twórczej. – culture.pl

External links
ArtKontakt.pl
Kompas Sztuki
Polish Pieta held at Cornell University's Johnson Museum of Art

20th-century Polish painters
20th-century Polish male artists
21st-century Polish painters
21st-century male artists
1946 births
2016 deaths
People from Staszów County
Academy of Fine Arts in Warsaw alumni
Polish male painters